Orthogonius assmuthi is a species of ground beetle in the subfamily Orthogoniinae. It was described by Wasmann in 1920.

References

assmuthi
Beetles described in 1920